Niklot I, Count of Schwerin (1250–1323) was the ruling Count of Schwerin-Wittenburg from 1299 until his death.  He was a son of Count Gunzelin III of Schwerin and his wife, Margaret of Mecklenburg.  Niklot married twice:
 Elisabeth, the daughter of Count John I of Holstein-Kiel
 Mirosalawa, the daughter of Duke Barnim I, Duke of Pomerania

Niklot was the father of:
 Gunzelin VI (d. 1327)
 Mechtild, a nun in Szczecin
 Beatrix, a nun in Szczecin
 Kunegonde, a nun in Zarrenthin
 Agnes, a nun in Zarrenthin
 Audacia, a nun and later abbess in Zarrenthin
 Anastasia, married in 1306 to Duke Valdemar IV of Schleswig and secondly, in 1313, to Count Gerhard IV of Holstein-Plön
 Barnim
 Miroslawa (1300-1368), married in 1327 Count John III of Holstein-Plön
 Nicholas II (d. 1350)

Counts of Schwerin
1250 births
1323 deaths
13th-century German nobility
14th-century German nobility